Down to Us is a 2009 album of traditional Irish music performed by Patrick Sky (on uillean pipes) and Cathy Sky (on fiddle).

Track listing

 Reels: The Girl That Broke My Heart/ Callaghan's/ Connaught Heffer
 Set dance:jig; The Drunken Gauger/ Jackson's
 Reels: Galtee Ranger/Speed the Plough/Stewart's Longbow (reels)
 Marsáil an Fhiadh (The Deer's March)
 Jigs: The New House/Slopes of Sliabh Luachra/Dan Collins’Favorite
 Hornpipes: The Stranger/ Pol Ha’Penny
 Jigs: West Clare Jigs: Scully Casey's/The Yellow Wattle (fiddle solo)
 Reels: Paddy on the Lake/Sailing Into Walpole's Marsh/Lad O’Beirne's
 Jigs: Phillip Martin's/Newport Lasses
 Reels: Land of Sunshine/Lori Cole's Dawn
 Reels: The Scholar/Miss Monaghan's (piping solo)
 Hornpipes: Plains of Boyle/The Fairy's Hornpipe
 Reels: Cat That Ate the Candle/Reck's Farewell to Erin/The (old) Woman of the House
 The Blackbird Suite
 The Old Bush Reel/Spike Island Lasses
 Aisling Gheal

External Links
 Ossian USA website

2009 albums
Patrick Sky albums